Prvić (pronounced) is a small island in the Croatian part of the Adriatic Sea. It is situated in the Šibenik archipelago, about half a mile from the mainland, in the vicinity of Vodice. The whole island is under protection of the Croatian Ministry of Culture since the island is considered a cultural heritage.

History
The name of the island was possibly derived from ancient Greek Proteras, from which could have been Prvin, the name of the pre-Christian Croatian god of spring. The other theory says that the name derives from the fact that Prvić is first ("prvi") island from the mainland in the Šibenik archipelago.

In 14th and 15th century the island belonged to noble families from Šibenik. During Ottoman conquests in 16th and 17th century, the island was inhabited by refugees from the mainland.

During World War II many of the inhabitants of the island joined the antifascist movement. Prvić was highly important in defending region against the Nazi occupation. There are many antifascist monuments on the island.

Economy

Prvić's main industries are agriculture (grapes, olives and figs), fishing and tourism. The sea around Prvić is quite rich with fish. Inhabitants of Prvić are known for making tasty and healthy olive oil and good wine. As mentioned, they often go fishing as well. Therefore, Mediterranean cuisine, especially Dalmatian, is common.

Tourism
Tourism is the most important economic branch on the island. There is just one hotel on the island, Hotel Maestral in Prvić Luka, but locals rent their apartments, houses and villas for tourists.

Culture
There are four Roman Catholic churches on the island. Two in Šepurine and two in Prvić Luka. The smaller church in Šepurine was built in medieval times, and the bigger one in the 19th century. There are many cultural events on the island during the year, such as; music concerts, art exhibitions, many sport competitions and others.

Every year on August 2 there is a local celebration in Prvić Luka, and on August 16 the fešta is in Šepurine.

Villages
There are two villages on the island:
Prvić Luka and
Šepurine.

The islands total area is 2.37 km2 and has a population of 403. Prvić is the third most densely populated island in Croatia. Šepurine is located on the west side of the island opposite Vodice. Prvić Luka is situated in the biggest bay on the southeast side and it is well protected from the northern and western winds.

Interesting facts
Famous Croatian bishop, inventor and polymath Faust Vrančić is buried in a church in Prvić Luka.
In Šepurine the Faust Vrančić family had a large baroque-style summer residence which is now in the possession of the Draganić family.
Saint Ante Antić was born in Šepurine.
There are no cars on the whole island, except a fire truck. There are a few tractors and bicycles. 
Many ancient and medieval artifacts were found on the island.

See also
 Adriatic Boat Show
 City of Šibenik
 City of Vodice
 Krka National Park
 Kornati National Park

References

External links
Hotel Maestral

 Šibenik Region - Prvić

Islands of Croatia
Islands of the Adriatic Sea
Landforms of Šibenik-Knin County